Denny railway station served the town of Denny, Falkirk, Scotland from 1858 to 1930 on the Scottish Central Railway.

History 
The station opened on 26 March 1858 by the Scottish Central Railway. To the north east was the goods yard which had two goods sheds: one next to the station and the other was to the east of the yard. The signal box was to the southeast and opened in 1893. The line to the west served as a goods and mineral line, serving Herbertshire Colliery Pit, Stoneywood Goods and 
Carrongrove Paper Mill. Another line ran to the east of the station serving SSEB Bonnywater Electricity Siding. The station closed on 28 July 1930.

References

External links 

Disused railway stations in Falkirk (council area)
Railway stations in Great Britain opened in 1858
Railway stations in Great Britain closed in 1930
1858 establishments in Scotland
1930 disestablishments in Scotland